The zygomaticofacial nerve or zygomaticofacial branch of zygomatic nerve (malar branch) passes along the infero-lateral angle of the orbit, emerges upon the face through the zygomaticofacial foramen in the zygomatic bone, and, perforating the orbicularis oculi to reach the skin of the malar area.

It joins with the zygomatic branches of the facial nerve and with the inferior palpebral branches of the maxillary nerve (V2).

The area of skin supplied by this nerve is over the prominence of the cheek.

References

External links
 
 

Maxillary nerve